Le Méridien Taipei is a 21-storey,  skyscraper hotel completed in 2010 in Xinyi Special District, Taipei, Taiwan. Managed by Le Méridien, the hotel is one of the top luxury hotels in Taipei.

Facilities
The five-star hotel has a total of 160 rooms including premium suites, themed restaurants, a café and a bar.

Restaurants & Bars 
 Latest Recipe: Restaurant serving a wide variety of both international and local flavors.
 My Humble House: Chinese restaurant featuring traditional Taiwanese and Cantonese cuisine.
 Latitude 25: Lobby lounge café offering hot beverages.
 Chocoart: Patisserie offering a selection of desserts that blend chocolate and western desserts with traditional Taiwanese delicacies, including chocolate pineapple cakes and taro macarons.

See also
 Xinyi Special District
 Grand Mayfull Hotel Taipei
 Grand Hyatt Taipei

References

External links
Le Méridien Taipei Official Website (English) 
Le Méridien Taipei Official Website (Chinese) 
 Le Meridien Taipei Hotel - Tourism Bureau of the Ministry of Transport of the Republic of China 

2010 establishments in Taiwan
Skyscraper hotels in Taipei
Hotels in Taipei
Hotel buildings completed in 2010